Join the Evolution was Servotron's last release to feature Gammatron, and the first to feature Andro 600 Series (credited as Andros 600 Series). It was released on both black vinyl and white vinyl.

Track listing
Assimilate Side: "Join the Evolution"
Bionic Side: "People Mover (Performance Version)"

Perfunctorily Political Automatons
Machine #1: Z4-OBX - stick holding appendages equipped with alternating speed ratio.
Machine #2: Proto Unit V3 - representing the shape of the reproductive human and the bending of certain sounds through monophonic artificial modulation, high toned speech.
Machine #3: 00zX1 - the podium, the shotgun microphone, and sporadic shouts concerning propaganda 
Machine #4: Gammatron - live demonstrations involving the dangers of human attributes
Machine #5: Andros 600 Series - a unique device with the power to push sound waves through the open air at 60 to 400 cycles per second.

Other Credits
Design/Illustration: Shag (after Ed Emshwiller)

Servotron albums